Garth Christian was an English nature writer, editor, teacher and conservationist.

Life 
He was born in a Derbyshire vicarage which had been occupied by his father and grandfather for almost 50 years, and was a member of the same family as Fletcher Christian. At the age of 18, he began contributing to the Guardian's Miscellany column.

After becoming a full-time freelance writer, he wrote for newspapers and magazines including the Birmingham Post, Birmingham Evening Mail, Nottingham Guardian, The Times, Country Life and New Scientist. From 1950, he was editor of The Plough.

He wrote a number of books on conservation and ornithology, one of which, Down the Long Wind, had a jacket illustrated by Peter Scott.

As a school governor, he took the unusual step of becoming an honorary (unpaid) teacher of biology, one afternoon a week.

Positions 

 Nature conservator, Chailey Common
 Council member, Sussex Archaeological Society
 Council member, Sussex Naturalists' Trust
 County Secondary School governor

Bibliography

References 

Year of birth missing
Year of death missing
English nature writers
English ornithologists
People from Derbyshire
School governors